is a private university at Ise, Mie, Japan. The predecessor of the school was founded in 1882, and it was chartered as a university in 1940.

Kogakkan University is one of only two universities in Japan to offer a Shinto studies program, whose graduates earn the qualifications needed to become a kannushi (Shinto priest). The other university to offer such a program is Kokugakuin University in Tokyo.

Education and Research

Departments
 Literature
 Shinto
 Japanese Literature
 Japanese History
 Communication
 Education
 Education
 Contemporary Japanese society
 Contemporary Japanese society

Graduate programs
Literature
 Shinto specialization
 Japanese Literature specialization
 Japanese History specialization
 Education
 Education specialization

Special Programs
Shinto Studies Graduate Program

Notable people

Faculty and staff 

 Yamada Yoshio, linguist
 Shigeru Yoshida, former Prime Minister of Japan
 Shuichi Toyama, archaeologist and historian
 Hideki Togi, composer and actor
 Hiroya Ino, politician and MP

Alumni 

 Hirokazu Shiba, politician and MP
 Ochiai Naobumi, poet and literary scholar
 Mika Ōkura, female baseball player
 Eiraku San'yūtei, rakugo performer, student of San'yūtei Enraku V

References

External links 
  

Educational institutions established in 1882
Private universities and colleges in Japan
Universities and colleges in Mie Prefecture
Ise Grand Shrine
Shinto universities and colleges
Nabari, Mie
1882 establishments in Japan